Honey Creek is an unincorporated community in Fall Creek Township, Henry County, Indiana, United States.

History
Honey Creek was founded in 1858 near the stream from which it took its name.

Geography

Notable people

Thane Houser, Indy car driver

References

Unincorporated communities in Henry County, Indiana
Unincorporated communities in Indiana